Marvin Palmer Morris "Cyclone, Cy" Wentworth (January 24, 1904 – October 10, 1982) was a Canadian hockey player. He played in the National Hockey League between 1927 and 1940 with the Chicago Black Hawks, Montreal Maroons, and Montreal Canadiens. He won the Stanley Cup with the Maroons in 1935.

Playing career
In 1926, Wentworth became a professional player with Eddie Livingstone's Chicago Cardinals, a new team in the American Hockey Association (AHA) which intended to rival the NHL. Under pressure from the NHL, the team folded in March 1921. Wentworth would sign with the Chicago Black Hawks.

In 1931–32, Wentworth, who had become the picture of defensive efficiency, was named the team's captain.  Near the beginning of the 1932–33 season, he was traded to the Montreal Maroons. In Montreal, Cy won his first and only Stanley Cup when his Maroons defeated Toronto in the 1935 finals after eliminating his old teammates from Chicago. Wentworth was Montreal's leading point-getter in those playoffs with three goals and two assists in seven games.

Wentworth was traded again just before the Maroons folded in 1938. He didn't have to move far to continue his career, however, as he was traded to the Montreal Canadiens. He played two seasons with the Habs before retiring in 1940, after which he moved to Toronto and became involved in a variety of business interests.

Career statistics

Regular season and playoffs

References

External links
 

1904 births
1982 deaths
Canadian ice hockey defencemen
Chicago Blackhawks captains
Chicago Blackhawks players
Chicago Cardinals (ice hockey) players
Ice hockey people from Ontario
Montreal Canadiens players
Montreal Maroons players
Ontario Hockey Association Senior A League (1890–1979) players
People from Grimsby, Ontario
Stanley Cup champions